Tell Me Your Secrets is an American thriller drama television series created by Harriet Warner that was set to premiere on TNT before premiering on Amazon Prime Video on February 19, 2021. The series was also written by Warner who executive produced alongside Bruna Papandrea and Casey Haver.

Premise
Tell Me Your Secrets follows "a trio of characters, each with a mysterious and troubling past: Emma (formerly known as Karen Miller) is a woman who once looked into the eyes of a dangerous killer, John is a former serial rapist desperate to find redemption, and Mary is a grieving mother obsessed with finding her missing daughter. As each of them is pushed to the edge, the truth about their pasts and motives grows ever murkier, blurring the lines between victim and perpetrator."

Cast and characters

Starring
 Lily Rabe as Emma Hall
 Amy Brenneman as Mary Barlow
 Hamish Linklater as John Tyler
 Enrique Murciano as Peter Guillory

Main 
 Chiara Aurelia as Rose Lord
 Ashley Madekwe as Lisa Guillory
 Bryant Tardy as Jay Abellard
 Elliot Fletcher as Jake Barlow
 Xavier Samuel as Kit Parker
 Stella Baker as Theresa Barlow

Recurring
 Marque Richardson as Tom Johnston
 Katherine Willis as Diana Lord
Richard Thomas as Bodie Lord
Emyri Crutchfield as Jess Cairns
 Charles Esten as Saul Barlow
Chase Stokes as Adam

Episodes

Production

Development
On July 24, 2017, TNT officially gave the production, then called Deadlier Than the Male, a pilot order. The show was one of two pilots that TNT ordered with an eye toward a new programming block it is prepping, TNT Mystery, along with Deep Mad Dark.

On February 15, 2018, it was announced that TNT had given a series order to be created and written by Harriet Warner. The series order was reportedly for a first season in which Warner will also executive produce alongside Bruna Papandrea and Casey Haver. John Polson directed the series and also serves as an executive producer. Production companies involved in the series include Made Up Stories and Studio T. On June 18, 2018, it was announced that the series had been retitled Tell Me Your Secrets.

In June 2020, it was announced the series would not be aired on TNT and had been scrapped. However, at the end of October 2020, Amazon Prime Video announced it had acquired the series set to air in 2021. On January 27, 2021, it was announced that the series would premiere on February 19, 2021.

Casting
Alongside the initial series announcement, it was reported that Lily Rabe, Amy Brenneman, Hamish Linklater, Enrique Murciano, Chiara Aurelia, Ashley Madekwe, and Bryant Tardy had joined the show in series regular roles. In June 2018, it was reported that Xavier Samuel and Stella Baker had joined the main cast and that Marque Richardson would appear in a recurring capacity. In July 2018, it was announced that Katherine Willis and Charles Esten had been cast in recurring roles.

Filming
Principal photography for the series took place in mid-2018 in New Orleans, Louisiana.

Reception 
The critical response to Tell Me Your Secrets has been mixed. Review aggregator Rotten Tomatoes reported an approval rating of 50% based on 22 reviews. The website's critical consensus reads, "Lily Rabe, Amy Brenneman, and a glut of insane mysteries nearly save Tell Me Your Secrets - alas, it's simply too underwritten and cynical to fulfill its alluring promise." On Metacritic, it has a weighted average score of 55 out of 100 based on 6 reviews, indicating "mixed or average reviews".

References

External links
 

2020s American drama television series
2021 American television series debuts
Amazon Prime Video original programming
Television series by Amazon Studios
American thriller television series
Television series by Studio T
English-language television shows
Television series by Made Up Stories